Events in the year 1967 in Belgium.

Incumbents
Monarch: Baudouin
Prime Minister: Paul Vanden Boeynants

Events
 13 February – Nocturnal explosion at the law courts on Burg Square damages the stained glass windows of the Basilica of the Holy Blood.
 1 May – Walter Godefroot wins 1967 Liège–Bastogne–Liège cycling race.
 22 May – L'Innovation Department Store fire in Brussels.
 10 October – Belgian Judicial Code adopted.
 16 October – New NATO headquarters in Brussels inaugurated.

Publications
 Georges Simenon, Le Chat

Art and architecture
Films
 Luc de Heusch (dir.), Jeudi on chantera comme dimanche

Births
 10 May – Ilse Uyttersprot, politician (died 2020)

Deaths
 15 August – René Magritte (born 1898), artist
 27 December — Marguerite Lefèvre (born 1894), geographer

References

 
1960s in Belgium
Belgium
Years of the 20th century in Belgium
Belgium